Kolberg-Körlin (earlier spelling Colberg-Cörlin) was a Landkreis (county) in the Prussian Province of Pomerania between 1872 and 1945. Its territory  roughly corresponds with modern Kołobrzeg County and the western parts of modern Białogard County with Karlino, the former Körlin.

History
Kolberg-Körlin comprised the village of Altstadt (now Budzistowo), a predecessor of nearby Kolberg founded before 1000 A.D. Other early settlements in the region are Pobloth and Zwilipp, both of which are first mentioned in 1159 according to the Pomeranian Urkundenbuch, and the localities Drosedow, Jarchow and Rützow, first mentioned in 1180 by the same source. Most of Kolberg–Körlin’s other municipalities have records dating back to the 13th Century.

Colberg-Cörlin was created on 1 September 1872 as a partition of Kreis Fürstenthum, the successor of the Principality of Cammin. It belonged to the government region (Regierungsbezirk) Cöslin (later Köslin) in the Prussian province of Pomerania, and comprised rural regions as well as the towns of Colberg and Cörlin. The county seat was in Colberg.

Following World War I, Colberg-Cörlin was renamed Kolberg-Körlin.

After Prussia was effectively absorbed into the Third Reich, Prussia and its districts, like all other German states under Hitler, was stripped of all genuine powers and were reduced to mere administrative units.

In early 1945 at the end of World War II, Kolberg-Körlin was occupied by the Red Army. Shortly thereafter, as a result of the Potsdam Agreement, Kolberg-Körlin, along with the rest of the former Prussian lands east of the Oder-Neisse line, became Polish. Most of the German population was evacuated or expelled and the area was resettled by Poles.

The territory of former Kolberg-Körlin subsequently became part of the Sczcecin, Koszalin and West Pomeranian Voivodeships.

Demographics 
The district had majority German population, with a small Polish (Kashubian) minority.

Municipalities
On 1 January 1945 the Landkries Kolberg-Körlin comprised the town of Körlin, with approximately 3,400 residents, and about 78 other communities with less than 2,000 inhabitants. In 1900, the county comprised the following municipalities and population:

Alt Bork 381
Alt Marrin, Gutsbezirk 316
Alt Quetzin 411
Alt Tramm 443
Alt Werder 280
Altstadt 25
Altstadt, Gutsbezirk 115
Baldekow 158
Baldekow, Gutsbezirk 155
Bartin 267
Bodenhagen 512
Bogenthin 188
Bullenwinkel 148
Büssow 307
Damgardt 307
Damitz 409
Dassow 451
Degow 1.073
Drenow 433
Drenow, Gutsbezirk 201
Drosedow 337
Drosedow, Gutsbezirk 326
Dumzin, Gutsbezirk 224
Eickstedtswalde, Gutsbezirk 136
Fritzow 205
Fritzow, Gutsbezirk 208
Gandelin 95
Gandelin, Gutsbezirk 252
Ganzkow 49
Ganzkow, Gutsbezirk 163
Garchen 199
Garrin 939
Gervin 564
Grandhof, Gutsbezirk 64
Gribow 474
Groß Jestin 1.618
Groß Pobloth 37
Groß Pobloth, Gutsbezirk 206
Groß Vorbeck, Gutsbezirk 96
Hohenfier, Gutsbezirk 77
Jaasde 35
Jarchow, Gutsbezirk 205
Karkow, Gutsbezirk 162
Karvin 329
Kerstin 99
Kerstin, Gutsbezirk 262
Kienow, Gutsbezirk 110
Klaptow, Gutsbezirk 332
Klein Jestin 72
Klein Jestin, Gutsbezirk 109
Klein Pobloth, Gutsbezirk 259
Kolberg 24.786
Kolberger Deep 237
Kölpin 331
Kölpin A, Gutsbezirk 97
Kölpin B, Gutsbezirk 65
Körlin 2.998
Körlin, Gutsbezirk 102
Koseeger, Gutsbezirk 252
Kowanz 445
Kruckenbeck, Gutsbezirk 225
Krühne, Gutsbezirk 83
Leikow 123
Leppin, Gutsbezirk 136
Lestin, Gutsbezirk 494
Lübchow 112
Lübchow, Gutsbezirk 204
Lustebuhr, Gutsbezirk 237
Mallnow 106
Mallnow, Gutsbezirk 132
Mechenthin 65
Mechenthin, Gutsbezirk 105
Meierei, Gutsbezirk 157
Mohrow 173
Moitzelfitz 140
Moitzelfitz, Gutsbezirk 282
Moitzlin, Gutsbezirk 195
Moltow, Gutsbezirk 180
Mühlenbruch, Gutsbezirk 30
Naugard 176
Necknin 186
Nehmer 388
Nessin 365
Neu Bork 147
Neugasthof, Gutsbezirk 105
Neu Marrin, Gutsbezirk 71
Neu Quetzin 141
Neu Sternin 413
Neu Tramm 159
Neu Werder 114
Neurese 347
Papenhagen, Gutsbezirk 64
Peterfitz 218
Peterfitz, Gutsbezirk 70
Petersfelde, Gutsbezirk 152
Petershagen 636
Plauenthin, Gutsbezirk 169
Poldemin 169
Prettmin 349
Pustar, Gutsbezirk 204
Putzernin, Gutsbezirk 101
Rabuhn 401
Rabuhn, Gutsbezirk  10)
Ramelow 204
Ramelow, Niedergut, Gutsbezirk 171
Ramelow, Obergut, Gutsbezirk 188
Reselkow 471
Reselkow, Gutsbezirk 99
Rogzow 48
Rogzow, Gutsbezirk 335
Roman 403
Roman, Gutsbezirk 277
Rossenthin 210
Rützow, Gutsbezirk 476
Rüwolsdorf 187
Schleps 269
Schmuckenthin, Gutsbezirk 124
Schötzow 72
Schötzow, Gutsbezirk 192
Schwartow, Gutsbezirk 153
Schwedt 513
Schwedt, Gutsbezirk  14)
Seefeld 278
Sellnow 517
Semmerow 269
Simötzel 910
Sophienwalde, Gutsbezirk 21
Spie 257
Sternin 134
Stöckow 379
Stolzenberg 979
Trienke, Gutsbezirk 314
Wartekow 96
Wartekow, Gutsbezirk 151
Wobrow 153
Zernin 637
Zürkow, Gutsbezirk 114
Zwilipp 283

See also
Goscino
History of Prussia
Pomerania
Prussia
West Pomeranian Voivodeship

References

External links
Landkreis Kolberg-Körlin
Die Stadt Kolberg und Landkreis Kolberg-Körlin
A Brief History of Pomerania
Pommern
gemeindeverzeichnis.de

History of Pomerania
Kolberg-Körlin
Regions of Poland
Kołobrzeg County
Białogard County
1872 establishments in Prussia
States and territories disestablished in 1945